Ioane (16 May 1768 in Tbilisi, Georgia – 15 February 1830 in Saint Petersburg, Russia) was a Georgian prince (batonishvili), writer and encyclopaedist.

Life

A son of George XII, the last king of Kartl-Kakheti kingdom, eastern Georgia, by his first wife Ketevan Andronikashvili, Ioane commanded an avant-garde of a Georgian force annihilated by the Persian army at the Battle of Krtsanisi in 1795.

Following the battle, the kingdom entered a period of economic crisis and political anarchy. To eradicate the results of a Persian attack and to overcome the retardation of the feudal society, Prince Ioane proposed on 10 May 1799, a project of reforms of administration, army and education. This project was, however, never materialized due to the weakness of George XII and a civil strife in the country. In 1800, he commanded a Georgian cavalry in the joined Russian-Georgian forces that defeated his uncle, Alexandre Bagrationi, and the Dagestani allies at the battle of Niakhura.

Upon the death of George XII, Kartl-Kakheti was incorporated into the expanding Russian Empire, and Ioane was deported to Russia. He settled in Saint Petersburg where he wrote most of his works with a didactic encyclopedic novel Kalmasoba (1817–1828) being the most important of them.

He is also an author of a naturalist encyclopedia (1814), a children encyclopedia (1829), a Russian-Georgian dictionary, a Georgian lexicon, and of several poems.

His manuscripts were discovered in 1861 by a Georgian scholar, Dimitri Bakradze, who published them in an abridged version in 1862.

He married in 1787, Princess Ketevan Tsereteli (1775–1832), daughter of Prince Zurab Tsereteli (1747–1823), Mayor of the Palace (sakhlt-ukhutsesi) of Imereti, and had the only son, Grigol.

Ancestry

References
David M. Lang, Prince Ioann of Georgia and His "Kalmasoba", American Slavic and East European Review, Vol. 11, No. 4 (Dec., 1952), pp. 274–287
Soviet Georgian Encyclopedia, vol. 5, pp. 188–189. Tbilisi, 1980 (in Georgian)

External links 
 

Male writers from Georgia (country)
Scientists from Georgia (country)
Military personnel from Georgia (country)
Georgian princes
Bagrationi dynasty of the Kingdom of Kartli-Kakheti
Military personnel from Tbilisi
1768 births
1830 deaths
18th-century people from Georgia (country)
19th-century people from Georgia (country)
Battle of Krtsanisi
Burials at Lazarevskoe Cemetery (Saint Petersburg)
Burials at the Dukhovskaya Church
Writers from Tbilisi